Live in the Heart of Helsinki is the first live album and video by Swedish melodic death metal band Soilwork. It was recorded live on March 21, 2014 at the Circus in Helsinki, Finland. The DVD was produced by Jouni Markkanen, directed by Ville Lipiäinen and mixed by Kimmo Ahola. It was released in 2CD+DVD and 2CD+BD formats.

Background
Band frontman Björn "Speed" Strid commented on the release saying: "There could've not been a better time than now, with 10 albums out and a very varied back catalogue to choose from. Our line up now is 50 % original members and 50 % fresh blood, which makes it all more interesting. Especially since the newest members have brought so much to our sound and have continued to inspire us to write new and exciting music and also brought a new found energy on stage. Now is definitely the time to see us. Trust me."

Bonus features on the DVD/BD include two documentaries ("Spectrum of Eternity: A Brief History of Soilwork" and "Behind the Scenes of the Living Infinite") and four drumcam videos.

Track listing

Personnel 
 Björn Strid – vocals
 David Andersson – guitar
 Sylvain Coudret – guitar
 Sven Karlsson – keyboards
 Ola Flink – bass, Backing  Vocals
 Dirk Verbeuren – drums

References

2014 live albums
Soilwork albums